Oncinema is a genus of plants in the family Apocynaceae first described as a genus in 1834. It contains only one known species, Oncinema lineare , native to South Africa.

References

Monotypic Apocynaceae genera
Flora of South Africa
Asclepiadoideae